The graph coloring game is a mathematical game related to graph theory. Coloring game problems arose as game-theoretic versions of well-known graph coloring problems. In a coloring game, two players use a given set of colors to construct a coloring of a graph, following specific rules depending on the game we consider. One player tries to successfully complete the coloring of the graph, when the other one tries to prevent him from achieving it.

Vertex coloring game 

The vertex coloring game was introduced in 1981 by Brams and rediscovered ten years after by Bodlaender. Its rules are as follows: 
 Alice and Bob color the vertices of a graph G with a set k of colors.
 Alice and Bob take turns, coloring properly an uncolored vertex (in the standard version, Alice begins). 
 If a vertex v is impossible to color properly (for any color, v has a neighbor colored with it), then Bob wins. 
 If the graph is completely colored, then Alice wins.

In the 1991 Bodlaender's paper, the computational complexity was left as "an interesting open problem".
Only in 2020 it was proved that the game is PSPACE-Complete.

Relation with other notions

Acyclic coloring. Every graph  with acyclic chromatic number  has .

Marking game. Almost every known upper bound for the game chromatic number of graphs are obtained from bounds on the game coloring number.

Cycle-restrictions on edges. If every edge of a graph  belongs to at most  cycles, then .

Graph Classes

For a class  of graphs, we denote by  the smallest integer  such that every graph  of  has . In other words,  is the exact upper bound for the game chromatic number of graphs in this class. This value is known for several standard graph classes, and bounded for some others:
 Forests: . Simple criteria are known to determine the game chromatic number of a forest without vertex of degree 3. It seems difficult to determine the game chromatic number of forests with vertices of degree 3, even for forests with maximum degree 3.  
 Cactuses: .
 Outerplanar graphs: .
 Planar graphs: .
 Toroidal grids:  .
 Partial k-trees: .
 Interval graphs: , where  is for a graph the size of its largest clique.

Cartesian products.

 For a single edge we have:

 For stars we have:

 Trees: 
 Wheels:  if 
 Complete bipartite graphs:  if

Open problems
These questions are still open to this date.

Edge coloring game 

The edge coloring game, introduced by Lam, Shiu and Zu, is similar to the vertex coloring game, except Alice and Bob construct a proper edge coloring instead of a proper vertex coloring. Its rules are as follows:
 Alice and Bob are coloring the edges a graph G with a set k of colors.
 Alice and Bob are taking turns, coloring properly an uncolored edge (in the standard version, Alice begins). 
 If an edge e is impossible to color properly (for any color, e is adjacent to an edge colored with it), then Bob wins. 
 If the graph is completely edge-colored, then Alice wins.

Although this game can be considered as a particular case of the vertex coloring game on line graphs, it is mainly considered in the scientific literature as a distinct game.

General case

For every graph G, . There are graphs reaching these bounds but all the graphs we know reaching this upper bound have small maximum degree. 

Conjecture. There is an  such that, for any arbitrary graph , we have .

 Arboricity. Let  be the arboricity of a graph . Every graph  with maximum degree  has .

Graph Classes

For a class  of graphs, we denote by  the smallest integer  such that every graph  of  has . In other words,  is the exact upper bound for the game chromatic index of graphs in this class. This value is known for several standard graph classes, and bounded for some others:
 Wheels:  and  when .

Open Problems 

Upper bound. Is there a constant  such that  for each graph  ? If it is true, is  enough ?

Conjecture on large minimum degrees.

Incidence coloring game 

The incidence coloring game is a graph coloring game, introduced by Andres, and similar to the vertex coloring game, except Alice and Bob construct a proper incidence coloring instead of a proper vertex coloring. Its rules are as follows:
 Alice and Bob are coloring the incidences of a graph G with a set k of colors.
 Alice and Bob are taking turns, coloring properly an uncolored incidence (in the standard version, Alice begins). 
 If an incidence i is impossible to color properly (for any color, i is adjacent to an incident colored with it), then Bob wins. 
 If all the incidences are properly colored, then Alice wins.

For every graph  with maximum degree , we have .

Relations with other notions 

  (a,d)-Decomposition. This is the best upper bound we know for the general case. If the edges of a graph  can be partitioned into two sets, one of them inducing a graph with arboricity , the second inducing a graph with maximum degree , then .  If moreover , then .
 Degeneracy. If  is a k-degenerated graph with maximum degree , then . Moreover,  when  and  when .

Graph Classes 

For a class  of graphs, we denote by  the smallest integer  such that every graph  of  has .
 Paths : For , . 
 Cycles : For , .
 Stars : For , .
 Wheels : For , . For , .
 Subgraphs of Wheels : For , if  is a subgraph of  having  as a subgraph, then .

Open Problems 

 Is the upper bound  tight for every value of  ?
 Is the incidence game chromatic number a monotonic parameter (i.e. is it as least as big for a graph G as for any subgraph of G) ?

Notes

References (chronological order) 

 
 
 
 
 
 
 
 
 
 
 
 
 
 
 
 
 
 
 
 
 
 
 
 
 
 
 
 
 
 
 
 
 

Graph coloring